Brothers was built in Whitby, England in 1815. She made one voyage for the British East India Company (EIC), and two transporting convicts to Australia. Afterwards she traded across the Atlantic, primarily to Quebec, and was last listed in 1837.

Career
Her registration transferred to London in 1817.

EIC voyage (1820–1821): Captain Ralph Stamp sailed from The Downs on 2 May 1820, bound for Bombay. Brothers reached Bombay on 10 August. Homeward bound, she was at the Cape of Good Hope on 25 December. She reached Saint Helena on 17 January 1821 and arrived at Gravesend on 22 March.

She was repaired in 1823. 

First convict voyage (1823–1824): Under the command of Captain Charles Motley she sailed from The Downs, England to Hobart and Sydney. She departed on 6 December 1823 and arrived at  Hobart on 15 April 1824. She then arrived at Sydney on 7 May 1824. She had embarked 90 female convicts. She landed 50 convicts at Hobart and 39 convicts at Sydney. One convict had died on the voyage. 

Second convict voyage (1826–1827): Captain Motley sailed from Cork, Ireland, on 3 October 1826, bound for Sydney. Brothers arrived in Sydney on 2 February 1827. She had embarked 161 female convicts; three convicts died on the voyage.

Fate
Brothers was last listed in Lloyd's Register in 1837 as being at London with Bartholomew, master, and Chapman, owner.

Citations and references
Citations

References

External links
Barque Brothers SS 650 tons at Trove

1815 ships
Ships built in Whitby
Convict ships to New South Wales
Convict ships to Tasmania
Ships of the British East India Company
Age of Sail merchant ships of England